Crown Hill Park is a  recreation area operated by Jefferson County Open Space in unincorporated Jefferson County, Colorado.  The park is located between the cities of Wheat Ridge and Lakewood.  Within the borders of the park is a National Urban Wildlife Refuge.  Activities at the park include picnicking, hiking, biking, horseback riding, wildlife viewing, walking, roller blading, jogging, and fishing.

Accessibility 
Crown Hill Park is located in a highly developed region of Jefferson County in close proximity to Denver, Colorado.  It is convenient to many of the transportation networks in the metro area, including

RTD (Regional Transportation District) 
 Bus # 76 runs along Wadsworth Boulevard,  from the park's eastern border.
 Bus # 100 runs along Kipling Parkway, on the park's western border.
 Bus # 28 and # 32 run along W 26th and W 32nd Avenues respectively, but end at Wadsworth, now making them no closer than the 76.
(The 28 and 32 bus routes previous to COVID-19 service reductions both continued west of Wadsworth, but in 2021 they don't.)

Automobile 
The park lies along 2 major thoroughfares, Kipling Parkway and Wadsworth Boulevard. For those arriving by car, the park features 6 ADA accessible parking spaces.

Bicycle 
The cities of Lakewood and Wheat Ridge maintain 2 on-street bike routes, along the southern border of the park on West 26th Avenue, and along the park's western border on Kipling Parkway

Horseback 
Signs are posted along West 26th Avenue advising motorists to exercise caution for those visiting the park by horse. The park features a horse arena beside the dedicated parking lot for equestrian activities.

Facilities 

  of natural surface trail
  of hard surface trail
 Flush restroom and drinking fountain, ADA accessible
 2 small picnic shelters, each with one ADA accessible picnic table; 1 at main parking lot, 1 overlooking Kestrel Pond
 18 park benches
 8 picnic tables, 1 ADA accessible in each picnic shelter
 Horse hitching rail near restroom
 Horse exercise arena maintained by the City of Lakewood
 ADA accessible fishing pier
 Fitness trail; Wells Fargo Gamefield course installed with the support of the East Jeffco Kiwanis
 2 asphalt parking lots; 1 lot with 103 parking spaces plus 5 ADA accessible, equestrian parking lot with 13 parking spaces plus 1 ADA accessible and 2 horse trailer spaces

Ecology

Flora 
Crown Hill Park's general lack of vegetative diversity is the legacy of its agricultural past.  85% of the cover is non-native grasslands; the remaining 15% are wetland/riparian.

Graminoids 
(Grasses, grass-like plants)
 Canada bluegrass ([Poa compressa])
 Canada wildrye (Elymus canadensis) - native
 cheatgrass (Bromus tectorum)
 crested wheatgrass (Agropyron cristatum)
 fescue (Festuca sp.)
 foxtail barley (Hordeum jubatum) - native
 goatgrass (Aegilops cylindrica)
 green needlegrass (Nassella viridula) - native
 intermediate wheatgrass (Elytrigia intermedia)
 intermediate wheatgrass (Elytrigia intermedia v. trichophorum)
 Japanese brome (Bromus japonicus)
 Kentucky bluegrass (Poa pratensis)
 orchardgrass (Dactylis glomerata)
 quackgrass (Agropyron repens)
 rye (Secale cereale)
 sand dropseed (Sporobolus cryptandrus) - native
 slender wheatgrass (Elymus trachycaulus) - native
 smooth brome (Bromus inermis)
 sedge (Carex sp.) - native
 spikerush (Eleocharis sp.) - native
 tall wheatgrass (Elytrigia elongata)
 timothy (Phleum pratense)
 western wheatgrass (Agropyron smithii) - native
 wild oats (Avena fatua ssp. sativa)

Forbs 

(Non-woody flowering plant that is not a grass)
 alfalfa (Medicago sativa)
 alyssum (Alyssum minus)
 asparagus (Asparagus officinalis)
 aster (Aster sp.) - native
 bindweed (Convolvulus arvensis)
 black medic (Medicago lupulina)
 Canada thistle (Cirsium arvense)
 cattails (Typha sp.) - native
 cf. coreopsis (Coreopsis tinctoria) - native
 clasping peppergrass (Lepidium perfoliatum)
 copper mallow (Sphaeralcea coccinea) - native
 curly dock (Rumex crispus)
 Dalmatian toadflax (Linaria dalmatica)
 dandelion (Taraxacum officinale)
 false flax (Camelina microcarpa)
 false salsify (Scorzonera (Podospermum) laciniatum)
 fieldcress (Neolepia campestre)
 fleabane (Erigeron divergens) - native
 fogfruit (Phyla (Lippia) cuneifolia) - native
 giant ragweed (Ambrosia trifida)
 goosefoot (Chenopodium sp.)
 groundcherry (Physalis sp.) - native
 gumweed (Grindelia squarrosa) - native
 hairy evening-primrose (Oenothera villosa) - native
 hairy vetch (Vicia villosa)
 horseweed (Conyza canadensis)
 Jimm Hill mustard (Sisymbrium altissimum)
 kochia (Kochia scoparia)
 mallow (Malva neglecta)
 mullein (Verbascum thapsus)
 musk thistle (Carduus nutans)
 narrow-leaf plantain (Plantago lanceolata)
 oyster plant (Tragopogon porrifolius)
 pennycress (Thlaspi arvense)
 poison hemlock (Conium maculatum)
 prickly lettuce (Lactuca serriola)
 ragweed (Ambrosia sp.)
 red clover (Trifolium pratense)
 salsify (Tragopogon dubius)
 scarlet gaura (Gaura coccinea) - native
 showy milkweed (Asclepias speciosa) - native
 slim-flowered scurfpea (Psoralea tenuiflora) - native
 tansy mustard (Descurainia sp.)
 thistle (Cirsium cf. undulatum) - native
 tumble knapweed (Centaurea diffusa)
 velvety gaura (Gaura parviflora) - native
 white heath aster (Aster ericoides) - native
 white sweetclover (Melilotus alba)
 whitetop (Cardaria chalapense)
 whitetop (Cardaria draba)
 wintercress (Cardaria chalepensis)
 yellow sweetclover (Melilotus officinalis)
 wild licorice (Glycyrrhiza lepidota) - native

Trees and shrubs 

 green ash (Fraxinus pensylvanica)
 black locust (Robinia sp.)
 peachleaf willow (Salix amygdaloides) - native
 plains cottonwood (Populus deltoides ssp. monolifera) - native
 rabbitbrush (Chrysothamnus nauseosus ssp. graveolens) - native
 Rocky Mountain juniper (Juniperus scopulorum)
 Russian olive (Eleagnus angustifolia)
 sandbar willow (Salix exigua) - native
 Siberian elm (Ulmus pumila)
 silver maple (Acer saccharinum)
 wild rose (Rosa sayi) - native

Fauna

Avian 
In order of frequency of observations

 European starling
 Canada goose
 mallard
 red-winged blackbird
 mourning dove
 northern flicker (common)
 house finch
 killdeer
 black-billed magpie
 house sparrow
 American robin
 song sparrow
 Brewer's blackbird
 American tree sparrow
 black-capped chickadee
 common grackle
 green-winged teal
 northern shoveler
 American kestrel
 blue-winged teal
 wood duck
 gadwall
 Wilson's warbler
 western kingbird
 northern shrike
 violet-green swallow
 black tern
 cinnamon teal
 bullock's oriole
 spotted sandpiper
 western meadowlark
 yellow warbler
 great blue heron
 downy woodpecker
 red-tailed hawk
 sora
 Virginia rail
 warbling vireo
 American coot
 belted kingfisher
 blue jay
 hooded merganser
 merlin
 pied-billed grebe
 spotted towhee (rufous-sided)
 yellow-headed blackbird
 yellow-rumped warbler
 bald eagle

Fish
 catfish - stocked
 carp - stocked
 largemouth bass - stocked
 sunfish
 trout

History
When early settlers first came to Colorado they were often drawn by the lure of riches to be found in the towering mountains to the west. The California gold rush of 1849 brought tens of thousands of men, many of them previously farmers, to the west. Many prospected on their way through Colorado. Often their dreams of riches ended in dust, and the disappointed miners returned to the plains to resume their former way of life – farming.

A number of small farming communities grew up on the rolling highlands west of pioneer Denver and Auraria. The area offered rich soil that, with irrigation, yielded abundant crops of wheat and vegetables. As its name reveals, the town of Wheat Ridge was built on a highland area that was soon covered with wheat farms. To its north the Clear Creek valley was soon filled with orchards and became known as Fruitdale. Further north, beyond the valley, other farmers built Arvada.

Henry Lee was born in Iowa, Oct. 31, 1841, to English immigrants. He became one of the best known Denver and Colorado pioneers. Henry came to Denver in 1864 from Iowa, following his elder brother, William, who arrived in the Denver area in 1845. William Lee had acquired extensive farming property between Wheat Ridge and Golden, just south of Clear Creek. The road to William's farm later became known as Lee Street. For the first few years Henry Lee earned his living by peddling vegetables from William's farm to miners in the mining camps of Gilpin, Clear Creek and Park counties. William Lee served as a member of the First Colorado Constitutional Convention in 1859, representing Jefferson County. He also founded the first grange in Colorado and was a prominent member of the Colorado Pioneer Society. William Lee died on January 21, 1911, at the age of 74.

Jennie Paul Lee was born in Iowa City, Iowa, on March 8, 1850. She married Henry Lee in 1873, and moved to Colorado in 1875, where they settled on Henry's farm. The Lee's had three children, two sons, Murray and Robert Paul, and a daughter, Jessie.

Always a public-spirited citizen, Henry Lee took a great deal of interest in politics. He represented Jefferson County in the House of Representatives Third Assembly and served two terms in the State Senate for the Fifth and Sixth Assemblies.

While a member of the Third General Assembly and chairman of its committee on public lands, Henry Lee introduced a bill providing for the sale to the City of Denver, at a nominal price and without competition, of two sections of school land for park purposes. One of these sections comprises what is now Denver's City Park. Lee was generally acknowledged as the father of the Denver park system, and served as Park Commissioner under both Mayors Johnson and Speer.

Over time Henry Lee acquired considerable land in Jefferson County, and at one time owned a whole section of what is now known as Edgewater and a large portion of Wheat Ridge. Crown Hill Cemetery is part of his old farm. Lee sold  of land to the Crown Hill Cemetery Association in 1908 for $47,000. In 1914 Henry Lee still owned  of the finest land in Jefferson County.

Henry Lee's involvement in irrigation and water-related problems led to the construction of Denver's first pumping station and the founding of the Agriculture Ditch Company. Henry served as secretary from the time the company was organized until his death. To support their extensive farming business, Henry and William Lee built the Lee and Brothers Lateral Irrigation Ditch, which ran along Middle Golden Road, now known as 32nd Avenue. William Lee also ran the Lee Sand and Gravel Company along Youngfield from 38th Avenue to North Golden Road (now known as 44 Avenue).

Henry Lee was a partner in the Pioneer Seed Company of Denver, and also owned Henry Lee's Seed and Farm Implements, selling seeds and farm equipment, and designing and selling farm and market wagons, road carts, spring wagons, surreys, and carriages. He had originally brought farm implements and seeds from Iowa to start his prosperous business.

In 1908 Crown Hill Associates also purchased land from the Union Pacific Railroad, which was adjacent to the property purchased from William and Henry Lee. With this last purchase of land, the Crown Hill Associates' total holdings included . Located on the property was the "Old Morgan House". Henry Lee had purchased the Morgan (also recorded as "Margan") Jones homestead in 1900. The portion containing the house, barns and other outbuildings, which are no longer standing, were contained in the land sold to Crown Hill in 1908.

On March 11, 1914, Henry Lee was the victim of one of Denver's first auto-pedestrian accidents. Henry Lee died on March 24 from his injuries, and was buried at Crown Hill Cemetery.

Jennie Lee continued to help run their farm until their son, Murray, died in 1939. Jennie Paul Lee died in November 1943 at the age of 93.

The two water bodies on the park property today were natural ponds. Waters stored in Crown Hill Lake originate in Clear Creek and are transported via the Crown Hill Agricultural Ditch to Crown Hill Lake. Most of the water in Kestrel Pond is seepage from Crown Hill Lake.

The farming communities of Wheat Ridge and Lakewood gradually grew. Local residents were becoming increasingly concerned about the loss of their country lands. When the citizens of Jefferson County created the Open Space Program in 1972, Crown Hill's neighbors began to urge the two cities to find a way to preserve one of the last large parcels of undeveloped land in what was then the most populous area of Jefferson County. In 1978 the Cities of Lakewood and Wheat Ridge joined the County in purchasing  next to Crown Hill Cemetery and including Crown Hill Lake, creating Crown Hill Open Space Park.

External links
Jefferson County Open Space Crown Hill Park official site

Parks in Colorado
Protected areas of Jefferson County, Colorado
Urban public parks